Yadolah Dodge is an Iranian and Swiss statistician. His major contributions are in the theory of operational research, design of experiments, simulation and regression.

Early life
He spent his early years in Abadan, Iran. He went then to the Gundeshapur  or Jundi Shapour University and obtained his Post Licentiate in Engineering in Agriculture in 1966 with distinction. He got his PhD at the Oregon State University in 1974.

Work
In the 1980s he became professor of statistics at the University of Neuchâtel, Switzerland, where  he is a professor emeritus. He is author of more than 60 papers and 25 books, many of which have appeared in multiple editions.
In 2015 Professor Dodge started the 'Iranian Film Festival Zurich' in order to have a cultural exchange between Iran and Switzerland.

Selected publications
Arthanari, T.S. and Y Dodge, Y. Mathematical Programming in Statistics, Wiley, 1993. 
Birkes, D. and Dodge, Y. Alternative Methods of Regression, Wiley, 1993, 
Dodge, Y., Analysis of Experiments with Missing Data, John Wiley & Sons, 1985, .
Dodge, Y., and Jureckovà, J. Adaptive regression. Springer-Verlag, 2000 .
Dodge, Y. (ed.), The Oxford Dictionary of Statistical Terms, Oxford University Press, Oxford, 2003.  
Dodge, Y. and Rousson, V. Analyse de regression appliquée, Dunod, 1999. 
Dodge, Y. and Melfi, G. Premiers pas en simulation, Springer, Paris, 2008. 
Dodge, Y., The Concise Encyclopedia of Statistics, 2008, Springer

References

1944 births
Living people
Iranian emigrants to Switzerland
Swiss statisticians
Oregon State University alumni
People from Abadan, Iran
Academic staff of the University of Neuchâtel